In enzymology, a glycine dehydrogenase is an enzyme that catalyzes the chemical reaction

glycine + H2O + NAD+  glyoxylate + NH3 + NADH + H+

The 3 substrates of this enzyme are glycine, H2O, and NAD+, whereas its 4 products are glyoxylate, NH3, NADH, and H+.

This enzyme belongs to the family of oxidoreductases, specifically those acting on the CH-NH2 group of donors with NAD+ or NADP+ as acceptor.  The systematic name of this enzyme class is glycine:NAD+ oxidoreductase (deaminating).

This should not be confused with:

the glycine dehydrogenase (decarboxylating), which is another name for the Glycine cleavage system P-protein.

or the glycine dehydroganse (cyanide forming)().

or the glycine dehydrogenase (cytochrome).

References

 

EC 1.4.1
NADH-dependent enzymes
Enzymes of unknown structure